Andrew Ogilvy-Wedderburn (born 4 August 1952) is a British bobsledder. He competed at the 1976 Winter Olympics and the 1980 Winter Olympics. He is also the 7th Baronet of Ballindean.

References

1952 births
Living people
British male bobsledders
Olympic bobsledders of Great Britain
Bobsledders at the 1976 Winter Olympics
Bobsledders at the 1980 Winter Olympics
People from Gosport
Baronets in the Baronetage of the United Kingdom
Andrew